Liberty Township is one of the twelve townships of Jackson County, Ohio, United States.  As of the 2010 census, 1,821 people lived in the township.

Geography
Located in the western part of the county, it borders the following townships:
Jackson Township: north
Coal Township: northeast
Lick Township: east
Franklin Township: southeast corner
Scioto Township: south
Beaver Township, Pike County: southwest
Jackson Township, Pike County: northwest

Some areas of southeastern Liberty Township are occupied by parts of the city of Jackson, the county seat of Jackson County.

Name and history
It is one of twenty-five Liberty Townships statewide.

Government
The township is governed by a three-member board of trustees, who are elected in November of odd-numbered years to a four-year term beginning on the following January 1. Two are elected in the year after the presidential election and one is elected in the year before it. There is also an elected township fiscal officer, who serves a four-year term beginning on April 1 of the year after the election, which is held in November of the year before the presidential election. Vacancies in the fiscal officership or on the board of trustees are filled by the remaining trustees.

References

External links
County website

Townships in Jackson County, Ohio
Townships in Ohio